Neodiaptomus is a genus of freshwater copepods in the family Diaptomidae. It contains the following species, four of which are listed as vulnerable species on the IUCN Red List (marked "VU" below):
Neodiaptomus curvispinosus Dang & Ho, 2001
Neodiaptomus intermedius Flössner, 1984  (India)
Neodiaptomus laii Kiefer, 1974  (Malaysia)
Neodiaptomus lindbergi Brehm, 1951
Neodiaptomus lymphatus (Brehm, 1933)  (Indonesia)
Neodiaptomus madrasensis Roy, 1999
Neodiaptomus meggitti Kiefer, 1932
Neodiaptomus physalipus Kiefer, 1935  (India)
Neodiaptomus schmackeri (Poppe & Richard, 1892)
Neodiaptomus siamensis Proongkiat & Sanoamuang, 2008
Neodiaptomus songkhramensis Sanoamuang & Athibai, 2002
Neodiaptomus vietnamensis Dang & Ho, 1998
Neodiaptomus yangtsekiangensis Mashiko, 1951

References

Diaptomidae
Taxonomy articles created by Polbot